The 2008 West Virginia Democratic presidential primary took place on May 13, 2008 with polls closing at 7:30 p.m. EST. It was open to Democrats and Independents. The primary determined 28 delegates to the 2008 Democratic National Convention, who were awarded on a proportional basis. West Virginia's Democratic delegation also included 11 unpledged "superdelegates".  The primary came late in the nomination race. Hillary Clinton won by a very wide margin, but her opponent Barack Obama maintained a substantial lead in the overall number of pledged delegate votes.

Polls

As of May 4, 2008, opinion polling showed Sen. Hillary Clinton holding a 56% to 27% lead over Sen. Barack Obama, with 17% undecided.

Some of West Virginia's superdelegates also endorsed a candidate prior to the primary.  By February 20, more than a month before the election, three superdelegates had announced support for Sen. Hillary Clinton (DNC Members Marie Prezioso, Pat Maroney, and Belinda Biafore), while three had endorsed Sen. Barack Obama (Rep. Nick Rahall, Sen. Jay Rockefeller, and Sen. Robert C. Byrd).

Results 

Primary date: May 13, 2008

National pledged delegates determined: 28

See also
 Democratic Party (United States) presidential primaries, 2008
 West Virginia Republican caucuses, 2008

References

External links
 WV Secretary of State - Election Returns

West Virginia
2008 West Virginia elections
2008
May 2008 events in the United States